Lizanne Bussières (born August 20, 1961 in Sainte-Foy, Quebec) is a former long-distance runner from Canada, who competed in the women's marathon at two consecutive Summer Olympics for her native country, starting in 1988. She won the silver medal at the 1994 Commonwealth Games.

Achievements

References
 Canadian Olympic Committee

1961 births
Living people
Athletes (track and field) at the 1986 Commonwealth Games
Athletes (track and field) at the 1990 Commonwealth Games
Athletes (track and field) at the 1994 Commonwealth Games
Athletes (track and field) at the 1988 Summer Olympics
Athletes (track and field) at the 1992 Summer Olympics
Canadian female long-distance runners
Commonwealth Games medallists in athletics
Commonwealth Games silver medallists for Canada
Olympic track and field athletes of Canada
People from Sainte-Foy, Quebec City
Sportspeople from Quebec City
French Quebecers
Universiade medalists in athletics (track and field)
Universiade bronze medalists for Canada
Medalists at the 1989 Summer Universiade
Medallists at the 1994 Commonwealth Games